SM U-154 was one of the 329 submarines serving in the Imperial German Navy in World War I. U-154 was engaged in the naval warfare and took part in the First Battle of the Atlantic.

Summary of raiding history

References

Notes

Citations

Bibliography

World War I submarines of Germany
1917 ships
Ships built in Flensburg
U-boats commissioned in 1917
Maritime incidents in 1918
U-boats sunk in 1918
U-boats sunk by British submarines
German Type U 151 submarines
Ships lost with all hands